Organic conductor can refer to :
 Conductive polymer
 Organic semiconductor
 Organic superconductor
and possibly:
 graphite
 graphene